James Louis Merlo  (born October 3, 1951) was an American football linebacker who played seven seasons in the National Football League. He played college football at Stanford University.

1951 births
Living people
American football linebackers
Stanford Cardinal football players
New Orleans Saints players
People from Sanger, California